Ausia may refer to

 Ausia, Bangladesh
 Ausia, Pakistan, village in Punjab province, Pakistan.
 Ausia (genus) with one species: Ausia fenestrata, an Ediacaran period fossil.